Iceland competed at the 1936 Summer Olympics in Berlin, Germany.

Results by event

Athletics

Men
Track & road events

Field events

Combined events – Decathlon

Water polo

 Men (8 athletes)

References
Official Olympic Reports

Nations at the 1936 Summer Olympics
1936
Summer Olympics